Nielsen Hayden may refer to:

Patrick Nielsen Hayden (born 1959), American science-fiction editor
Teresa Nielsen Hayden (born 1956), American science-fiction editor

Compound surnames